Artur Beliakou (born 20 May 1993) is a Belarusian male acrobatic gymnast. With Aliona Dubinina, he competed in the 2014 Acrobatic Gymnastics World Championships.

At the 2017 World Games, he won a silver medal in the mixed pairs all-around event.

At the 2018 Acrobatic Gymnastics World Championships, he won a bronze medal in the team event.

At the 2019 Acrobatic Gymnastics European Championships, he won a silver medal in the mixed pairs dynamic event.

References

External links

 

1993 births
Living people
Belarusian acrobatic gymnasts
Male acrobatic gymnasts
Medalists at the Acrobatic Gymnastics World Championships
World Games silver medalists
Competitors at the 2017 World Games
European Games medalists in gymnastics
European Games bronze medalists for Belarus
Gymnasts at the 2019 European Games